Scott Byron Grix (born 1 May 1984) is a former Ireland international rugby league footballer who last played as a  for Halifax Panthers in the Betfred Championship.

He previously played for the Doncaster Dragons, Halifax, Leigh Centurions and the Widnes Vikings in National League One. Grix also played for the Limoux Grizzlies in the Elite One Championship, and Wakefield Trinity in the Super League in two separate spells. He also played for the Huddersfield Giants in two separate spells in the top flight, and spent time on loan from Huddersfield at Halifax in the Championship.

On 22 September 2021 he announced his retirement at the age of 37.

Background
Grix was born in Halifax, West Yorkshire, England.

International career
Grix is an Ireland international, making his début in 2006 against Russia. He was named as captain of the Ireland squad for the 2008 Rugby League World Cup, and was one of his countries better players in the tournament.

He later relinquished the captaincy to Liam Finn, however, he continued to feature for Ireland and was named in their squad for the 2013 Rugby League World Cup.

In October and November 2015, Grix played in the 2015 European Cup.

In 2016 he was called up to the Ireland squad for the 2017 Rugby League World Cup European Pool B qualifiers.

Personal life
He is the older brother of fellow professional rugby league footballer Simon Grix, and cousin of professional association (soccer) footballer Michael Collins.

Grix runs a strength and conditioning facility in Halifax.

References

External links
Wakefield Trinity profile
Huddersfield Giants profile
Wakefield Trinity Wildcats profile
Ireland profile
Leigh Profile
SL profile
Giants sign Grix from Wakefield
2017 RLWC profile

1984 births
Living people
Doncaster R.L.F.C. players
English rugby league players
English people of Irish descent
Halifax R.L.F.C. players
Huddersfield Giants players
Ireland national rugby league team captains
Ireland national rugby league team players
Leigh Leopards players
Rugby league fullbacks
Rugby league players from Halifax, West Yorkshire
Wakefield Trinity players
Widnes Vikings players